İnişli (also known as Balo) is a village in the Kozluk District of Batman Province in Turkey. The village is populated by Arabs and had a population of 430 in 2021.

The hamlets of Cemalo, Tepeli and Tunçbilek are attached to the village.

References 

Villages in Kozluk District
Arab settlements in Batman Province